The Moelleby Affair is a 1976 Danish family film directed by Tom Hedegaard and starring Poul Reichhardt.

Cast
 Poul Reichhardt as Borgmester Clemmensen
 Ove Sprogøe as Digter Mortensen
 Elin Reimer as Borgmesterfruen
 Dick Kaysø as Ivar
 Chili Turèll as Clara (as Inge Margrethe Svendsen)
 Lily Broberg as Kommunekasserens værtinde
 Arthur Jensen as Barber Nikolajsen
 Karl Stegger as Morbror Ole
 Edvin Tiemroth as Overretssagfører Kølle
 Ole Søltoft as Kølles søn
 Henning Palner as Ditlefsen
 Bjørn Puggaard-Müller as Bankdirektør Lund
 Ejner Federspiel as Assessor Godtfredsen
 Poul Thomsen as Due
 Jens Okking as Lang
 Christoffer Bro as Ingeniør
 Valsø Holm as Restauratør
 Kirsten Søberg as Hansigne
 Elga Olga Svendsen as Dame på rådhuset
 Else Petersen as Godtfredsens sekretær
 Jørgen Beck as Betjent

References

External links

1976 films
Danish children's films
1970s Danish-language films
Films with screenplays by Erik Balling